Walter John Stodart Anderson (baptised 9 October 1822 – 11 January 1903) was an English painter, lithographer, and engraver. He painted still lifes, landscapes and genre work.

United States
Anderson lived in Cincinnati, Ohio from 1849 to 1853, when he was an active lithographer and engraver. He worked first for Charles A. Jewett, a lithographer in the city. He collaborated with Sophie Gengembre, his future wife, and Thomas Faris. They worked together by 1851 when the first two lithographers of Protestant Episcopal bishops were produced.

He created illustrations for Biographical and Historical Memoirs of the Early Pioneer Settlers of Ohio written by Samuel P. Hildreth, as did his future brother-in-law Henry P. Gengembre. The book was published in 1852.

In 1853 the Gengembre family moved to Manchester, Pennsylvania and Anderson followed and married Sophie Gengembre.

Europe
Anderson and his wife moved to England by 1854. He began exhibiting his works there in 1856. They lived in Pennsylvania, near Pittsburgh, in 1859. By 1863 they had returned to London. He exhibited his works at the Royal Society of British Artists and the Royal Academy of Arts.

They moved to the Isle of Capri in 1871. They moved to England in the early 1890s and lived in Falmouth.

He died on 11 January 1903 in Falmouth.

Notes

References

External links

1822 births
1898 deaths
19th-century English painters
English male painters
English lithographers
English engravers
People from Peckham
19th-century English male artists